Rodrigo de Mandiá y Parga (1606 – 20 October 1674) was a Roman Catholic prelate who served as Bishop of Astorga (1672–1674), Bishop of Almería  (1663–1672), and Auxiliary Bishop of Toledo (1652-1663).

Biography
Rodrigo de Mandiá y Parga was born in Ferrol, Spain in 1606. On 14 October 1652, he was appointed during the papacy of Pope Innocent X as Auxiliary Bishop of Toledo and Titular Bishop of Siriensis. On 9 April 1663, he was appointed during the papacy of Pope Alexander VII as Bishop of Almería. On 12 December 1672, he was appointed during the papacy of Pope Clement X as Bishop of Astorga. He served as Bishop of Astorga until his death on 20 October 1674. While bishop, he was the principal consecrator of Principal Consecrator Carlo Bonelli, Titular Archbishop of Corinthus.

References

External links and additional sources
 (for Chronology of Bishops) 
 (for Chronology of Bishops) 

17th-century Roman Catholic bishops in Spain
1606 births
1674 deaths
Bishops appointed by Pope Innocent X
Bishops appointed by Pope Alexander VII
Bishops appointed by Pope Clement X